Cornel Wilde (born Kornél Lajos Weisz; October 13, 1912 – October 16, 1989) was a Hungarian-American actor and filmmaker.

Wilde's acting career began in 1935, when he made his debut on Broadway. In 1936 he began making small, uncredited appearances in films. By the 1940s he had signed a contract with 20th Century Fox, and by the mid-1940s he was a major leading man. He was nominated for the Academy Award for Best Actor for his performance in 1945's A Song to Remember. In the 1950s he moved to writing, producing and directing films, and still continued his career as an actor. He also went into songwriting during his career.

Early life
Wilde was born in 1912 in Privigye, Kingdom of Hungary (now Prievidza, Slovakia), although his year and place of birth are usually and inaccurately given as 1915 in New York City. His Hungarian Jewish parents were Vojtech Béla Weisz (anglicized to Louis Bela Wilde) and Renée Mary Vid (Rayna Miryam). He was named for his paternal grandfather, and upon arrival in the United States at the age of seven in 1920, his name was Anglicized to Cornelius Louis Wilde.

A talented linguist and an astute mimic, he had an ear for languages which became apparent later in his acting career. Wilde attended the City College of New York as a pre-med student, completing the four-year course in three years and winning a scholarship to the Physicians and Surgeons College at Columbia University. Wilde entered Columbia University, class of 1933, as one of the youngest undergraduates. He fenced for the Columbia Lions fencing team. He won the National Novice Foils Championship held at the New York Athletic Club in 1929.  

He qualified for the United States fencing team for the 1936 Summer Olympic Games, but quit the team before the games in order to take a role in the theater. In preparation for an acting career, he and his new wife Marjory Heinzen (later to be known as Patricia Knight) shaved years off their ages, three for him and five for her. As a result, most publicity records and subsequent sources wrongly indicate a 1915 birth for Wilde.

Career

Theatre
After studying at Theodora Irvine's Studio of the Theatre, Wilde began appearing in plays in stock and in New York. He made his Broadway debut in 1935 in Moon Over Mulberry Street. He also appeared in Love Is Not So Simple, Daughters of Etreus, and Having Wonderful Time.

He did the illustrations for Fencing, a 1936 textbook on fencing and wrote a fencing play, Touché, under the pseudonym of Clark Wales in 1937. He toured with Tallulah Bankhead in a production of Antony and Cleopatra; during the run he married his co-star Patricia Knight.

Acting jobs were sporadic over the next few years. Wilde supplemented his income with exhibition fencing matches; his wife also did modelling work. Wilde wrote plays, some of which were performed by the New York Drama Guild.

Wilde was hired as a fencing teacher by Laurence Olivier for his 1940 Broadway production of Romeo and Juliet and was given the role of Tybalt in the production. Although the show only had a small run, his performance in this role netted him a Hollywood film contract with Warner Bros.

Early films

Warner Bros.
Wilde had an uncredited bit part in Lady with Red Hair (1940), then got a small part in High Sierra (1941), which included a scene with Humphrey Bogart. He also had small roles in Knockout (1941) and Kisses for Breakfast (1941).

20th Century Fox
Wilde was then signed by 20th Century Fox who gave him a good role in a B picture The Perfect Snob (1941). It was followed by a war movie Manila Calling (1942).

He was the romantic male lead in Life Begins at Eight-Thirty (1942), supporting Monty Woolley, and supported Sonja Henie in Wintertime (1943).

A Song to Remember and stardom
In 1945, Columbia Pictures began a search for someone to play the role of Frédéric Chopin in A Song to Remember. They eventually tested Wilde, and agreed to cast him in the role after some negotiation with Fox, who agreed to lend him to Columbia and one film a year for several years. Part of the deal involved Fox borrowing Alexander Knox from Columbia to appear in Wilson (1944). A Song to Remember was a big hit, made Wilde a star and earned him a nomination for an Academy Award for Best Actor.

Columbia promptly used him in two more films, both swashbucklers: as Aladdin in A Thousand and One Nights with Evelyn Keyes and as the son of Robin Hood in The Bandit of Sherwood Forest (made 1945, released 1946).

Back at Fox, he played the male lead in Leave Her to Heaven (1945), with Gene Tierney and Jeanne Crain, an enormous hit at the box office. So too when it was released was Bandit.

In 1946, Wilde was voted the 18th-most popular star in the United States, and in 1947 the 25th-. Fox announced him for Enchanted Voyage. It ended up not being made; instead he was reunited with Crain in Fox's musical Centennial Summer (1946).

Suspension
In January 1946, Wilde was suspended by Fox for refusing the male lead in Margie (1946). This suspension was soon lifted so Wilde could play the male lead in the studio's big budget version of Forever Amber (1947). Filming started, then was halted when the studio decided to replace Peggy Cummins, the female star. In October 1946, Wilde refused to return to work unless he was paid more; his salary was $3,000 a week, with six years to run – he wanted $150,000 per film for two films per year. The parties came to an agreement and filming resumed. Wilde also appeared with Maureen O'Hara in The Homestretch (1947).

He was in a comedy at Columbia with Ginger Rogers, It Had to Be You (1947). At Fox he turned down a role in That Lady in Ermine (1948). Not wanting to go on suspension again he agreed to make The Walls of Jericho (1948), from the same director as Leave Her to Heaven but less popular. Road House (1948), for Fox, was a highly regarded noir and a decent-sized hit. He then left Fox, which he later regarded as a mistake.

Freelance
At Columbia, Wilde was in Shockproof (1949), another noir, with his then-wife Patricia Knight. They appeared together in Western Wind, a play at the Cape Playhouse.

Wilde made Swiss Tour, aka Four Days Leave (1949), an independent film in Switzerland. He returned to Fox for Two Flags West (1950), then went to RKO for At Sword's Point (filmed in 1949, but not released until 1952), a swashbuckler with Maureen O'Hara.

He played a trapeze artist in The Greatest Show on Earth (1952) for Cecil B. de Mille, an enormous hit, though Wilde was one of several stars in the movie.

At Columbia, he was in California Conquest (1952), a Western for producer Sam Katzman. He went over to Warner Bros. for Operation Secret (1952), then was back at Fox for Treasure of the Golden Condor (1952).

He focused on adventure stories: Saadia (1953) for MGM, Star of India (1954) for United Artists. He had a part in the all-star executive drama Woman's World (1954) for Fox, then went back to action and adventure with Passion (1954) for RKO.

Producer and director
In the 1950s Wilde and his second wife, Jean Wallace, formed their own film production company, Theodora, named after Theodora Irvine. Their first movie was the film noir The Big Combo (1955), a co production with Security Pictures that was released through Allied Artists. Wilde and Wallace played the leads. That year he also directed an episode of General Electric Theatre.

That same year, he appeared in an episode of I Love Lucy as himself and starred in The Scarlet Coat (1956) for MGM.

Storm Fear 
Wilde produced and starred in another for Theodora with Wallace, Storm Fear (1956) from a script by Horton Foote. This time Wilde also directed "to save money".

Theodora announced Wilde would play Lord Byron, but the film was never made. Other announced projects included Curly and Second Act Curtin.

Wilde was meant to appear as Joshua in de Mille's The Ten Commandments but was not in the final film – he turned down the role, saying it was too small and the pay was too little (John Derek ended up playing it). Wilde later said it was his worst mistake because having even a small role in a big blockbuster would have given him career momentum.

As an actor only, he appeared in Hot Blood (1956) with Jane Russell for director Nicholas Ray, and Beyond Mombasa (1956), shot in Kenya; both were released by Columbia. In 1957, he guest-starred in an episode of Father Knows Best as himself. Also in 1957, he played the role of the 13th century Persian poet Omar Khayyám in the film Omar Khayyam.

The Devil's Hairpin and Maracaibo 
He produced, directed and starred in two films for Theodora that were released through Paramount: The Devil's Hairpin (1957), a car-racing drama, and Maracaibo (1958). Wilde called them "an acceptable A-B, meaning a picture with B budget but A pretensions".

He had the lead in Edge of Eternity (1959) for director Don Siegel.

Lancelot and Guinevere 
Wilde went to Italy to star in Constantine and the Cross (1962). In Britain, he wrote, produced, directed and starred in Lancelot and Guinevere (1963).

The Naked Prey 
Wilde produced, directed, and starred in The Naked Prey (1965), in which he played a man stripped naked and chased by hunters from an African tribe affronted by the behavior of other members of his safari party. The original script was largely based on a true historical incident about a trapper named John Colter being pursued by Blackfeet Indians in Wyoming. Lower shooting costs, tax breaks, and material and logistical assistance offered by Rhodesia persuaded Wilde and the other producers to shoot the film on location in Rhodesia (now Zimbabwe). It is probably his most highly regarded film as director.

Beach Red 
Wilde followed this with a war movie, Beach Red (1967). He announced Namugongo, another movie in Africa, about the White Fathers missionaries in the Kingdom of Buganda, but it was never made. He had a supporting role in The Comic (1969), directed by Carl Reiner.

No Blade of Grass 
He wrote, produced, and directed the science fiction film No Blade of Grass (1970).

Shark's Treasure 
He returned to film shortly thereafter and wrote, directed, and starred in the exploitation film Sharks' Treasure, a 1975 film intended to capitalize on the "Shark Fever" popular in the mid-1970s in the wake of the success of Peter Benchley's Jaws. He acted in The Norseman (1978) and The Fifth Musketeer (1979).

Television 
Cornel Wilde played himself in the 1955 I Love Lucy episode "The Star Upstairs." He also appeared in the 1957 episode of Father Knows Best "An Evening to Remember". He appeared as an unethical surgeon in the 1971 Night Gallery episode "Deliveries in the Rear" and portrayed an anthropologist in the 1972 TV movie Gargoyles.

Personal life
In 1937, he married the actress Patricia Knight. She starred alongside him in Shockproof (1949). Their daughter, Wendy, was born on February 22, 1943. The family lived at Country House on Deep Canyon Road, Los Angeles.  They divorced in 1951.

Five days after his divorce, he married the actress Jean Wallace. Wilde became stepfather to Wallace's two sons, Pascal and Thomas, from her marriage to Franchot Tone. Their son, Cornel Wallace Wilde, was born on December 19, 1967. Wilde senior and Wallace starred together in several films including The Big Combo (1955), Lancelot and Guinevere (1963), and Beach Red (1967). They divorced in 1981.

A Democrat, Wilde supported the campaign of Adlai Stevenson during the 1952 presidential election.

Death
Wilde died of leukemia on October 16, 1989, three days after his 77th birthday. He is interred in the Westwood Village Memorial Park Cemetery in Westwood, Los Angeles.

For his contribution to the motion picture industry, Cornel Wilde has a star on the Hollywood Walk of Fame at 1635 Vine Street.

Filmography

Film

Television

Radio appearances

References

External links

 

1912 births
1989 deaths
20th Century Studios contract players
20th-century American male actors
American male film actors
American people of Hungarian-Jewish descent
Burials at Westwood Village Memorial Park Cemetery
California Democrats
Columbia Lions fencers
Columbia University Vagelos College of Physicians and Surgeons alumni
Deaths from cancer in California
Deaths from leukemia
Hungarian Jews
Hungarian emigrants to the United States
Jewish American male actors
Male Western (genre) film actors
Townsend Harris High School alumni